Doreen Kimura  (February 15, 1933 – February 27, 2013) was a Canadian psychologist who was professor at the University of Western Ontario and professor emeritus at Simon Fraser University. Kimura was recognized for her contributions to the field of neuropsychology and later, her advocacy for academic freedom. She was the founding president of the Society for Academic Freedom and Scholarship.

Biography
Kimura was born in Winnipeg, Manitoba, and grew up in the village of Neudorf, Saskatchewan. Kimura was finishing her final year of high school via correspondence while teaching in a one-room schoolhouse in Northern Manitoba when she applied to and won an entrance scholarship to McGill University in Montreal. 

Kimura went on to earn bachelor's, master's, and doctoral (in 1961) degrees from McGill. Woodburn Heron supervised her master's thesis. She conducted her doctoral research at the Montreal Neurological Institute under the supervision of neuroscientist Brenda Milner (co-supervised by Donald O. Hebb).

Kimura joined the faculty at the University of Western Ontario in London, Ontario, in 1967, and remained there for the rest of her career.  In 1974, she established the Neuropsychology Unit at London’s University Hospital (now London Health Sciences Centre).

She had one daughter, named Charlotte Thistle Archer. Kimura died on February 27, 2013, at age 80, in Vancouver.

Work 
Kimura's early work, starting in the 1960s, assessed differences in the language and music processing capabilities of the two hemispheres of the brain. She demonstrated that right-handed subjects have a right-ear superiority for the reception of words and numbers, and left-ear superiority for the perception of melodies; she concluded that these superiorities must reflect the processing specializations of the left and right hemispheres of the brain. Kimura was among the first researchers to use dichotic listening tests in her work, a non-invasive method for studying the lateral asymmetry of auditory processing in the brain.

Kimura studied healthy individuals, as well as patients with apraxia and aphasia, to draw conclusions about the neurological underpinnings of communication. Her 1993 monograph, Neuromotor Mechanisms in Human Communication, summarized her research in this area over the prior two decades. 

Kimura's later interests included the relationship between sex and cognition and promoting academic freedom. In a number of publications, including her 2000 book Sex and Cognition, she suggested that cognitive and behavioural differences between males and females can be attributed to the influence of sex hormones on brain development. This work has been met with criticism by those who assert that gender differences are better explained by the influences of society and culture. In a special issue of the journal Canadian Psychology, Kimura argued against affirmative action for women in academia, calling it "demeaning" to women.

Awards and honours

 1985: Award for Distinguished Contributions to Canadian Psychology as a Science, Canadian Psychological Association
 2000: Nora and Ted Sterling Prize in Support of Controversy, Simon Fraser University
 2005: Donald O. Hebb Distinguished Contribution Award, Canadian Society for Brain, Behaviour, and Cognitive Science
2006: Kistler Prize, Foundation for the Future

Books
Neuromotor mechanisms in human communication (1993), Oxford: OUP 
Sex and Cognition (2000), Cambridge, MA: MIT Press

References

External links
Doreen Kimura's SFU website
Biography
In Memoriam: Dr. Doreen Kimura 

1933 births
2013 deaths
Academic staff of the University of Western Ontario
Academic staff of Simon Fraser University
Canadian psychologists
Canadian women psychologists
McGill University alumni
Fellows of the Royal Society of Canada
People from Winnipeg